The Afghanistan national cricket team toured the United Arab Emirates from 28 November to 4 December 2014. The tour consisted of four One Day International matches between UAE and Afghanistan. The United Arab Emirates won the series 3–1.

Squads

ODI series

1st ODI

2nd ODI

3rd ODI

4th ODI

References

External links
 Series home at ESPN Cricinfo

2014 in Afghan cricket
2014 in Emirati cricket
UAE 2014-15
International cricket competitions in 2014–15
Afghan 2014